The Henking Hotel and Cafe was a historic building at 15-21 Lyman Street in Springfield, Massachusetts.  Built in two stages in 1899 and 1909, it was a good example of a turn-of-the-century accommodation for railroad travelers in the city, notable for its establishment by some of area's early German immigrants.  The building was listed on the National Register of Historic Places in 1983, and demolished some time thereafter.

Description and history
The Henking Hotel and Cafe were two adjacent buildings on the east side of Lyman Street, at its junction with Kaynor Street.  The hotel building was four stories in height, with Georgian Revival styling in brick, while the adjacent cafe space was a two-story brick building, with glass-block windows flanking the entrance on the ground floor, and pairs of windows on the second level, which housed a ballroom.  That buildings cornice was designed to match that of the hotel.

The hotel building was built in 1880 for Gustave and Elizabeth Gruendler, German immigrants who had operated hotels elsewhere in the city for some time, and who were among the city's early German immigrant arrivals.  Upon their death the building was taken over by Henry Henking, who had worked for the Gruendlers.  He changed the name of the hotel and remodeled its facade in a Georgian Revival style.  His son Gus took over the business upon his death in 1906, and further expanded the business, building the adjacent banquet space.  The hotel was strategically located opposite an entrance to the railroad station, and the business of the small family-run hotel was good despite competition from larger hotels nearby.

See also
National Register of Historic Places listings in Springfield, Massachusetts
National Register of Historic Places listings in Hampden County, Massachusetts

References

Hotel buildings on the National Register of Historic Places in Massachusetts
Hotels in Springfield, Massachusetts
Hotels established in 1899
National Register of Historic Places in Springfield, Massachusetts
Demolished buildings and structures in Massachusetts